is a Noh play that is no longer part of the current repertoire.

Background
The Mari was the football in the ancient Japanese game of Kemari, a non-competitive form of Keepie uppie popular in the Heian period. The object of the game was to keep the deerskin ball aloft as long as possible without using one's hands. The game was popular among samurai, the youthful Saigyō, for example, being an expert player.

Plot
The death of a prominent footballer drives his widow mad, and she prepares a kind of kemari funeral-service for him: the eight football players are taken as equivalent to the eight chapters of the Hokke Scripture; with the four posts added, they correspond to the Twelvefold chain of causation.

Arthur Waley states that "The play ends with a 'football ballet'".

See also
Fujiwara no Narimichi
Temari
The Tale of Genji

Notes

References 

Noh
Noh plays